Martyn Jerel Buchwald (January 30, 1942 – September 27, 2018), known as Marty Balin, was an American singer, songwriter, and musician best known as the founder/leader and one of the lead singers and songwriters of Jefferson Airplane and Jefferson Starship.

Early life
Balin was born Martyn Jerel Buchwald in Cincinnati, Ohio, the son of Catherine Eugenia "Jean" (née Talbot) and Joseph Buchwald. His paternal grandparents emigrated from Eastern Europe. His father was Jewish and his mother was Episcopalian. Buchwald attended Washington High School in San Francisco, California. As a child, Balin was diagnosed with autism.

Career

Early musical work
In 1962, Buchwald changed his name to Marty Balin, and began recording with Challenge Records in Los Angeles, releasing the singles "Nobody But You" and "I Specialize in Love". By 1964, Balin was leading a folk music quartet called The Town Criers.

Jefferson Airplane
Balin was the primary founder of Jefferson Airplane, which he "launched" from a restaurant-turned-club he created and named The Matrix, and was also one of its lead vocalists and songwriters from 1965 to 1971. Balin was one of three Jewish members of the band, including guitarists Paul Kantner and Jorma Kaukonen. In the group's 1966–1971 iteration, Balin served as co-lead vocalist alongside Grace Slick. Balin's songwriting output diminished after Surrealistic Pillow (1967) as Slick, Kantner, and Kaukonen matured as songwriters, a process compounded by personality clashes. Balin's most enduring songwriting contributions were often imbued with a romantic, pop-oriented lilt that was atypical of the band's characteristic forays into psychedelic rock. Among Balin's most notable songs were "Comin' Back to Me" (a folk rock ballad later covered by Ritchie Havens and Rickie Lee Jones), "Today" (a collaboration with Kantner initially written on spec for Tony Bennett that was prominently covered by Tom Scott), and, again with Kantner, the topical 1969 top-100 hit "Volunteers". Although uncharacteristic of his oeuvre, the uptempo "3/5 of a Mile in 10 Seconds" and "Plastic Fantastic Lover" (both written for Surrealistic Pillow) remained integral components of the Airplane's live set throughout the late 1960s.

Balin played with Jefferson Airplane at the Monterey Pop Festival in 1967 and at the Woodstock Festival in 1969.

In December 1969, Balin was knocked unconscious by members of the Hells Angels motorcycle club while performing during the infamous Altamont Free Concert, as seen in the 1970 documentary film Gimme Shelter. In April 1971, he formally departed Jefferson Airplane after breaking off all communication with his bandmates following the completion of their autumn 1970 American tour. He elaborated upon this decision in a 1993 interview with Jeff Tamarkin of Relix:

Balin remained active in the San Francisco Bay Area rock scene, managing and producing an album for the Berkeley-based sextet Grootna before briefly joining funk-inflected hard rock ensemble Bodacious DF as lead vocalist on their eponymous 1973 debut album. The following year, Kantner asked Balin to write a song for his new Airplane offshoot group, Jefferson Starship. Together, they wrote the early power ballad "Caroline", which appeared on the album Dragon Fly with Balin as guest lead vocalist.

Jefferson Starship
Rejoining the team he had helped to establish, Balin became a permanent member of Jefferson Starship in 1975; over the next three years, he contributed to and sang lead on four top-20 hits, including "Miracles" (No. 3, a Balin original), "With Your Love" (No. 12, a collaboration between Balin, former Jefferson Airplane drummer Joey Covington, and former Grootna/Bodacious DF lead guitarist Vic Smith), Jesse Barish's "Count on Me" (No. 8), and N. Q. Dewey's "Runaway" (No. 12). Ultimately, Balin's relationship with the band was beleaguered by interpersonal problems and his own reluctance toward live performances. He abruptly left the group in October 1978 shortly after Slick's departure from the band.

Solo work, and reunion projects
In 1979, Balin produced a rock opera titled Rock Justice, about a rock star who was put in jail for failing to produce a hit for his record company, based on his experiences with the lawsuits fought for years with former Jefferson Airplane manager Matthew Katz. The cast recording was produced by Balin, but it did not feature him in performance.

Balin continued with EMI as a solo artist and in 1981 he released his first solo album, Balin, featuring two Jesse Barish songs that became top-40 hits, "Hearts" (#8) and "Atlanta Lady (Something About Your Love)" (#27). There was in 1983 a second solo album, Lucky, along with a Japan-only EP produced by EMI called There's No Shoulder. Balin's contract with EMI ended shortly thereafter.

In 1985, he teamed with former Jefferson Airplane members Paul Kantner and Jack Casady to form the KBC Band. After the breakup of the KBC band, a 1989 reunion album and tour with Jefferson Airplane followed.

Balin continued recording solo albums in the years following the reunion, and reunited with Kantner in the latest incarnation of Jefferson Starship.

Balin had intended to record lead vocals for two tracks for Jefferson Starship's album Jefferson's Tree of Liberty. However, his art touring schedule conflicted with studio sessions, and instead, the track "Maybe for You", from the German release of Windows of Heaven, was included.

On July 2, 2007, the music-publishing firm Bicycle Music, Inc. announced that it had acquired an interest in songs written or performed by Balin, including hits from his days with Jefferson Airplane and Jefferson Starship.

Honors
Balin, along with the other members of the 1966–1970 line-up of Jefferson Airplane, was inducted into the Rock and Roll Hall of Fame in 1996. As a member of Jefferson Airplane, he was honored with a Grammy Lifetime Achievement Award in 2016.

Personal life
Balin enjoyed painting all his life. He painted many of the most influential musicians of the last half of the 20th century. Marty Balin's Atelier was located at 130 King Fine Art in Saint Augustine, Florida, Balin's permanent signature collection gallery.

Balin resided in Florida and San Francisco with his wife, Susan Joy Balin, formerly Susan Joy Finkelstein. Balin and Finkelstein had daughters Jennifer Edwards and Delaney Balin. Susan's other daughters were Rebekah Geier and Moriah Geier.

Jennifer was born later in the year of his 1963 marriage to Victoria Martin. Balin married Karen Deal, Delaney's mother, in 1989. Karen died in 2010.

While on tour in March 2016, Balin was taken to Mount Sinai Beth Israel Hospital in New York City after complaining of chest pains. After undergoing open-heart surgery, he was transferred to an intensive-care unit to spend time recovering. In a subsequent lawsuit, Balin alleged that neglect and inadequate care facilities on the hospital's part had resulted in a paralyzed vocal cord, loss of his left thumb and half of his tongue, bedsores, and kidney damage.

Death
Balin died at his home in Tampa on September 27, 2018, at the age of 76.

Discography

Balin (1981)
Lucky (1983)
There's No Shoulder (1983) (EP, Japan only)
Better Generation (1991)
Freedom Flight (1997)
Marty Balin Greatest Hits (1999) (new recordings)
Marty Balin (2003)
Nashville Sessions (2008)
Time For Every Season (2009)
Blue Highway (2010)
The Witcher (2011)
Good Memories (2015)
The Greatest Love (2016)

with Bodacious DF
Bodacious DF (1973)

with KBC Band
KBC Band (1986)

compilations
Balince (1990)
Wish I Were (1995) (Europe only)
Mercy of the Moon: The Best of Marty Balin (2009)
Nothin' 2 Lose: The Lost Studio Recordings (2009)
415 Music: Rare Studio & Live Recordings 1980–82 (2011)

Solo singles

Other appearances

References

External links

Marty Balin - JeffersonAirplane.com
Marty Balin Interview
 Marty Balin (Oral History), Mill Valley Public Library, 2017
Tamarkin, Jeff. Jefferson Airplane biography
Fenton, Craig. Jefferson Airplane biography
A.D. Amorosi. Marty Balin: 5 Songs Variety (September 29, 2018)

1942 births
2018 deaths
American male singers
American rock singers
Hot Tuna members
Jefferson Airplane members
Jefferson Starship members
Jewish American musicians
Jewish rock musicians
Musicians from Cincinnati
Psychedelic rock musicians
Songwriters from Ohio
Challenge Records (1950s) artists
People on the autism spectrum